The International Air Transport Association (IATA ) is a trade association of the world's airlines founded in 1945. IATA has been described as a cartel since, in addition to setting technical standards for airlines, IATA also organized tariff conferences that served as a forum for price fixing.

Consisting in 2023 of 300 airlines, primarily major carriers, representing 117 countries, the IATA's member airlines account for carrying approximately 83% of total available seat miles air traffic. IATA supports airline activity and helps formulate industry policy and standards. It is headquartered in Montreal, Canada with executive offices in Geneva, Switzerland.

History
IATA was formed in April 1945 in Havana, Cuba. It is the successor to the International Air Traffic Association, which was formed in 1919 at The Hague, Netherlands. At its founding, IATA consisted of 57 airlines from 31 countries. Much of IATA's early work was technical and IATA provided input to the newly created International Civil Aviation Organization (ICAO), which was reflected in the annexes of the Chicago Convention, the international treaty that still governs international air transport.

The Chicago Convention did not result in a consensus on the economic regulation of the airline industry. According to Warren Koffler, IATA was formed to fill the resulting void and provide international air carriers with a mechanism to fix prices.

In the late 1940s, IATA started holding conferences to fix prices for international air travel. IATA secretary J.G Gazdik stated that the organization aimed to fix prices at reasonable levels, with due regard being paid to the cost of operations, in order to ensure reasonable profits for airlines.

In 1947 at a time when many airlines were government-owned and loss-making, IATA operated as a cartel, charged by the governments with setting a constrained fare structure that avoided price competition. The first Traffic Conference was held in 1947 in Rio de Janeiro and reached unanimous agreement on some 400 resolutions. IATA Director-General William Hildred recounted that about 200 of the resolutions at the Rio de Janeiro conference were related to establishing a uniform structure for tariffs charged for international air transportation.

The American Civil Aeronautics Board did not intervene to stop IATA's price fixing, and in 1954 law professor Louis B. Schwartz condemned the board's inaction as an "abdication of judicial responsibility". The Economist lambasted IATA's connivance with governments to fix prices and compared IATA with medieval guilds.

In the early 1950s IATA's price fixing regime forced airlines to attempt to differentiate themselves through the quality of their passenger experience. IATA responded by imposing strict limits on the quality of airline service. In 1958, IATA issued a formal ruling barring airlines from serving economy passengers sandwiches with "luxurious" ingredients. The economist Walter Adams observed that the limited service competition permitted by IATA tended to merely to divert traffic from one air carrier to another without at the same time enlarging the overall air transport market.

From 1956 to 1975, IATA resolutions capped travel agent commissions at 7% of the airline ticket price. Legal scholar Kenneth Elzinga argued that IATA's commission cap harmed consumers by decreasing the incentive for travel agents to offer improved service to consumers.

In 1982, the sociologist John Hannigan described IATA as "the world aviation cartel". IATA enjoyed immunity from antitrust law in several nations.

In 2006, the United States Department of Justice adopted an order withdrawing the antitrust immunity of IATA tariff conferences.

In March 2020, the COVID-19 pandemic interrupted routine flights around the world. In the immediate aftermath most airlines, because of the physical distancing policies implemented by national governments, reduced their seat loading by eliminating the sale of the middle seat in a row of three. This reduction averaged out to a load factor of 62% normal, well below the IATA industry break-even level of 77%. Fares would need to rise as much as 54% if a carrier were to break even, according to calculations done by the IATA, who posit that because of "forward-facing seats that prevent face-to-face contact, and ceiling-to-floor air flows that limit the circulation of respiratory droplets" the risk of transmission is reduced. North American carriers such as WestJet, Air Canada and American Airlines all planned to resume normal pattern sales on 1 July 2020. This industry-driven policy garnered immediate push-back from some Canadians, including those who felt defrauded, while Minister of Transport Marc Garneau noted that the "on-board spacing requirement is a recommendation only and therefore not mandatory" while his Transport Canada department listed physical distancing as a prophylactic among the key positive points in a guide prepared for the Canadian aviation industry.

Due to the COVID-19 pandemic, IATA has announced its mobile app The IATA Travel Pass to be launched in mid-April 2021 to aid travelers in complying with the flight policies of different governments.

Focus areas

Safety
IATA states that safety is its number one priority. The main instrument for safety is the IATA Operational Safety Audit (IOSA). IOSA has also been mandated at the state level by several countries. In 2017, aviation posted its safest year ever, surpassing the previous record set in 2012. The new global Western-built jet accident rate became the equivalent of one accident every 7.36 million flights. Future improvements will be founded on data sharing with a database fed by a multitude of sources and housed by the Global Safety Information Center. In June 2014, the IATA set up a special panel to study measures to track aircraft in flight in real time. The move was in response to the disappearance without a trace of Malaysia Airlines Flight 370 on 8 March 2014.

Simplifying the Business
Simplifying the Business was launched in 2004. This initiative has introduced a number of crucial concepts to passenger travel, including the electronic ticket and the bar coded boarding pass. Many other innovations are being established as part of the Fast Travel initiative, including a range of self-service baggage options.

An innovative program, launched in 2012 is New Distribution Capability. This will replace the pre-Internet EDIFACT messaging standard that is still the basis of the global distribution system /travel agent channel and replace it with an XML standard. This will enable the same choices to be offered to high street travel shoppers as are offered to those who book directly through airline websites. A filing with the US Department of Transportation brought over 400 comments.

Environment
IATA members and all industry stakeholders have agreed to three sequential environmental goals:
 An average improvement in fuel efficiency of 1.5% per annum from 2009 through 2020
 A cap on net carbon emissions from aviation from 2020 (carbon-neutral growth)
 A 50% reduction in net aviation carbon emissions by 2050 relative to 2005 levels.

At the 2013 IATA annual general meeting in Cape Town, South Africa, members overwhelmingly endorsed a resolution on "Implementation of the Aviation Carbon-Neutral Growth (CNG2020) Strategy." A representative for the European Federation for Transport and Environment criticized the resolution for relying on carbon offsets instead of direct reductions in aviation carbon emissions.

Services
IATA provides consulting and training services in many areas.

Publications - standards
A number of standards are defined under the umbrella of IATA. One of the most important is the IATA DGR for the transport of dangerous goods (HAZMAT) by air.

See also

 Air Transport Action Group (ATAG)
 Conex box
 Flight planning
 IATA airline code
 IATA airport code
 IATA Operational Safety Audit (IOSA)
 International Association of Travel Agents Network (IATAN)
 International Civil Aviation Organization (ICAO)
 International Society of Transport Aircraft Trading
 Kenneth Beaumont
 Standard Schedules Information Manual

References

External links 

 
 

 
Airline trade associations
International organizations based in Canada
Organizations established in 1945
Organizations based in Montreal
Non-profit organizations based in Montreal
Cartels